Mark Andrew Feltham (born 26 June 1963 at St John's Wood, London) played first-class cricket for Surrey County Cricket Club and subsequently Middlesex County Cricket Club between 1983 and 1996.

An all-rounder, his right-arm medium-fast bowling was insufficiently penetrative for him to reach the highest level, as his career average of 31.64 for his 388 first-class wickets indicates. As a right-handed batsman, he scored 3199 runs at an average of 21.46, and managed only one century (101) in 197 innings.

References 
CricketArchive

English cricketers
1963 births
Living people
Middlesex cricketers
Surrey cricketers